is a Japanese international rugby union player who plays as a loose forward.

Club career

Mimura signed for Yamaha Júbilo ahead of the 2011-12 Top League season and instantly became a regular starter for his new side.   He has made over 60 appearances in Japan's Top League.

International

Mimura was one of several Yamaha Júbilo players who received their first call-up to Japan's senior squad ahead of the 2016 end-of-year rugby union internationals.

References

1989 births
Living people
Japanese rugby union players
Japan international rugby union players
Rugby union number eights
Rugby union flankers
Shizuoka Blue Revs players
Sportspeople from Tochigi Prefecture
Meiji University alumni
Sunwolves players